Jeffrey "Free" Luers is a political activist from Los Angeles, California, who served a ten-year prison sentence for an arson motivated by environmental concerns. On February 14, 2007, the Oregon Court of Appeals overturned Luers' sentence, instructing the Lane County circuit court to determine a new sentence. That court reduced the sentence from 22 years, 8 months to 10 years in February 2008, after what The Independent described as an "international campaign for a more appropriate sentence for a crime in which no one was hurt."

Background
Luers is a former resident of Eugene, Oregon and helped establish Red Cloud Thunder, a group of activists who organized a tree sitting campaign to stop the clear-cutting of old growth forests outside of Fall Creek, Oregon.

Arson and sentencing
The first incident took place in Eugene, Oregon in the United States when Luers and Craig Marshall planted crude delay devices for an attempted arson of trucks at the Tyree Oil Company. The two placed a section of cloth, which was draped over a gallon milk jug filled with a fuel and soap mixture, in the fuel tank of a double-trailer fuel truck.  According to authorities, the potential blast could have caused damage over two city blocks.

On 16 June 2000, he set fire to three light trucks at Romania Chevrolet dealership suspectedly via the use of bombs, in Eugene as a protest against excessive consumption and global warming, along with Craig "Critter" Marshall, who was sentenced to five and a half years in prison. The arson destroyed three pickup trucks including a 2000 Silverado. Luers might have received a comparable sentence if he had not been convicted of an earlier attempted arson as well.  Luers was initially sentenced to 22 years, 8 months in prison. Supporters argued that his sentence was excessive, because no one was injured and property damage was estimated at only $40,000

The Oregon Court of Appeals overturned the sentence in 2007, remanding the case to the Lane County circuit court for resentencing. In February 2008, the circuit court approved a reduction in his term to 10 years, most of which had already been served.

Reaction to sentence
Luers has at times been a cause célèbre among some radicals, anti-prison activists, and individuals  associated with the Earth Liberation Front (ELF), although Luers has said that he does not consider himself to be an ELF member.

Mistaken release
On October 2, 2009 Luers was released from prison after being granted another 30% term reduction. Department of Corrections officials assumed he was eligible for early release under a bill enacted that year by the state legislature, but he was not. Luers was taken back into custody within hours.

Release in 2009
After serving 9.5 years, Luers was released from prison on December 16, 2009. He was interviewed by Amy Goodman on Democracy Now! about a week later and spoke about his sentencing, time in prison, and environmental attitudes. His attorney, Lauren Regan, was interviewed as well.

See also
Green anarchism
Green Scare
Rod Coronado
Tre Arrow
Marius Mason

References

External links

 
From Tree-Hugger to Terrorist 2002 New York Times article about Luers.
Documentary about his story, on youtube website
Luers Speaks Out in First Interview After 9.5 Years Behind Bars - video report by Democracy Now!

American people convicted of arson
American environmentalists
American prisoners and detainees
Living people
People from Eugene, Oregon
Place of birth missing (living people)
Prisoners and detainees of Oregon
1951 births